Sir Sackville Trevor (c. 1565–1633) was a Welsh sea captain and politician who sat in the House of Commons  in 1625.

Sackville Trevor was son of John Trevor of Trevalyn, Denbighshire, and the brother of Sir Richard Trevor, Sir John Trevor and Sir Thomas Trevor. He served with distinction under Admiral Howard of Effingham, and was knighted on 4 July 1604. He accompanied the future King Charles I to Spain in 1623.    

He was elected  Member of Parliament for Anglesey in 1625.  He was involved in the La Rochelle expedition of 1627.  

Trevor married Lady Eleanor Bagnell, widow of Sir Henry Bagnall and daughter of Sir John Savage of Clifton Cheshire.

References

1560s births
1633 deaths
Welsh knights
16th-century Welsh military personnel
17th-century Welsh politicians
Members of the Parliament of England (pre-1707) for constituencies in Wales
English MPs 1625
17th-century Royal Navy personnel